Monique Cabral (born December 9, 1986) is a sprinter from Trinidad and Tobago.

Personal bests

External links

Monique Cabral bio on LSUSports.net
Monique Cabral on DirectAthletics

1986 births
Living people
Trinidad and Tobago female sprinters